Scottish Airlines (Prestwick) Limited was formed in 1946 as a subsidiary of Scottish Aviation Limited. The airline commenced worldwide passenger and cargo charter flights from bases at Prestwick and Stansted. It also participated in the Berlin Airlift, became a trooping carrier for the British Armed Forces, and began contract flights on behalf of Air France, British European Airways (BEA), Compagnie Belge des Transports Aériens, Iceland Airways and KLM. 

Scottish Airlines also operated scheduled services in its own right between Prestwick Airport in Scotland and Ronaldsway Airport on the Isle of Man. Scottish Airlines ceased operations in 1960. Its aircraft and routes were taken over by Dan-Air in 1961.

Early history
Scottish Airlines (Prestwick) Ltd was an early post-World War II private, independent British airline.

In 1947 Scottish Airlines operated a fleet of 20 aircraft, which flew 1,480,154 miles (mi) (2,382,077 kilometres (km)). The airline carried 43,702 passengers during 1947 on a variety of scheduled and non-scheduled services, both under contract to other airlines as well as in its own right. Contract flights included charter flights between Prestwick and Iceland on behalf of Iceland Airways and scheduled services linking Prestwick with Belfast and London, Glasgow with Belfast and London, and Aberdeen with London under contract to BEA, as well as Prestwick with Paris under contract to Air France, Prestwick with Amsterdam under contract to KLM, and Prestwick and Manchester with Brussels under contract to Compagnie Belge des Transports Aériens. Contract flights for BEA terminated in July 1947 and those for Air France and KLM a short while later. The Icelandic and Belgian services continued into 1948. Scottish Airlines operated worldwide charter flights in its own right, including to destinations all over Europe, Africa, the Middle East, India, Canada and the United States.
Scottish Airlines operated B24 Liberators in 1947-8 to Athens from Northolt on a scheduled service on behalf of Hellenic Airlines. A scheduled service from Prestwick to Reyjavik (not Keflavik) and on to Copenhagen (Kastrup) then back to Prestwick  was also flown.

On 7 May 1948 a Scottish airlines Liberator departed Prestwick on a cargo charter flight to Calcutta via Rome, Cyprus, Basra and Karachi. On board was a ship's propeller shaft weighing 6 tons 7  cwt (6.5 tonnes) and measuring 19 feet (ft) 6 inches (5.9 m), which was urgently required for SS Clan Angus. At the time, this was believed to be one of the heaviest single pieces of machinery carried by a British commercial aircraft.

−One of Scottish Airlines' first overseas engagements was its participation in the 1948-49 Berlin Airlift. One Liberator was used from 4 August 1948 until 14 August 1948 , operating between Wunstorf and RAF Gatow. And two Liberators from 19 February 1949 until 12 July 1949 between RAF Schleswigland and RAF Gatow in Berlin. Flights with the Dakota have also been recorded. A total of 497 flights, carrying 458.2 tonnes of freight and 2716.5 tonnes of fuel have been carried in the Berlin Airlift by Scottish Airlines.

The 1950s and closure

During 1951-52 a scheduled service was operated on weekdays with Dakotas, linking Prestwick with RAF Burtonwood near Warrington (for Manchester and Liverpool) and on to RAF Northolt (for London). From late-1952 the service transited RAF Ringway for (Manchester) instead of Burtonwood. It ceased in early 1953.

Trooping flights and seasonal scheduled services between Prestwick and the Isle of Man commenced during the early 1950s.

A series of accidents involving five of the company's Avro Yorks — two at RAF Luqa in Malta and three at Stansted — called the airline's safety record into question, contributing to the Air Ministry's decision to stop using Scottish Airlines for trooping flights. As the firm had depended on trooping for most of its revenue and profit, the loss of these contracts hastened its demise.

Scottish Airlines ceased all flying operations in November 1960.

Dan-Air's purchase of Scottish Airlines assets from Scottish Aviation in early-1961 enlarged the former's scheduled operation through the addition of the latter's seasonal Prestwick—Isle of Man route. It also enabled Dan-Air to add a passenger-configured Douglas DC-3 to the two DC-3 freighters in its fleet. (Following its withdrawal from service in 1970, this aircraft (G-AMPP) was restored as Dan-Air's first DC-3 (G-AMSU) and put on display at the airline's Lasham engineering base from 1971 until 1991.)

Fleet 
Scottish Airlines operated the following aircraft types:

Avro 685 York (header image)
B-24 Liberator
Douglas DC-3/C-47
Fokker F.XXII
Scottish Aviation Twin Pioneer
Supermarine Walrus
Airspeed Consul
De Havilland Tiger Moth
De Havilland Dragon Rapide

Fleet in 1960
In April 1960 the fleet of Scottish Airlines comprised three aircraft.

Accidents and incidents
There are nine recorded accidents or incidents involving aircraft owned and/or operated by Scottish Airlines, five of which involved fatalities.

 The worst fatal accident in Scottish Airlines' history occurred on 18 February 1956, when one of the company's Avro 685 York C.1 airliners (registration: G-ANSY) crashed on its way from Egypt to the United Kingdom after taking off from Luqa Airport, Malta, killing all 50 occupants (45 service personnel and five crew). Following takeoff from Malta Luqa for London Stansted, the boost enrichment capsule in the carburettor of the no. 1 engine failed shortly after the aircraft had become airborne. This set the no. 1 engine on fire. Accident investigators presumed that this engine stopped producing power after only 30 seconds of flight. The flightdeck crew did not feather the engine's propeller as the aircraft was still slowly climbing to 700–800 feet above mean sea level (amsl)/300–400 ft above ground level (agl), with a "crabbing" or "yawing" motion to the left. The aircraft stalled and dove to the ground while still in a nose-up attitude at very low flying speed shortly after retracting the flaps. Although the failure of the aircraft's no. 1 engine was established as the accident's probable cause, loss of speed and consequent loss of control through an error of judgement of the pilot in command were considered important contributory factors.

 The second-worst fatal accident in Scottish Airlines' history occurred on 7 December 1957, when one of the firm's Scottish Aviation Twin Pioneer 1 planes (registration: G-AOEO) crashed  SSW of Tripoli, Libya. Following takeoff from Atshan airstrip for an expected three-and-a-half hour flight to Tripoli Idris Airport the aircraft failed to arrive at its destination. While the aircraft's wreckage was found  SSW of Tripoli, its left wing's outer panel was located 1,200 yards (yd) (1,100 metres (m)) from the main wreckage. The subsequent accident investigation established the failure of the forward tube of the "V brace" structure in the outer panel of the port wing due to fatigue as the probable cause. This failure caused the outer panel of the port wing to break away from the aircraft in flight. This in turn resulted in the aircraft becoming completely uncontrollable and diving vertically into the ground, killing all six occupants (two crew and four passengers).

 The third-worst fatal accident in Scottish Airlines' history occurred on 23 December 1957, when one of its Avro 685 York C.1 (registration: G-AMUN) crashed at Stansted Airport, England, killing all four crew members. The aircraft, which was due to land at Stansted at the end of a cargo flight from Malta, had already carried out two missed approaches. On the third approach it collided with a tree three-quarters of a mile (1.21 km) short of the runway. This resulted in the aircraft bursting into flames. Accident investigators established an error on the part of the captain, which resulted in an approach below the critical height without sufficient visual reference to the ground while he attempted to land, as the probable cause.

 There were two further fatal accidents involving Scottish Airlines, which resulted in two fatalities in each case. These occurred on 30 April 1956 and on 10 March 1960 respectively.

 The former involved an Avro 685 York C.1 (registration: G-AMUL) carrying Royal Air Force (RAF) personnel and their families from Stansted to RAF Habbaniya, Iraq, via Malta. The captain decided to abort his takeoff and closed the throttles. The first officer pulled back the no. 1 throttle, which was not fully closed. Despite the flightdeck crew's action, the aircraft ran off the side of the runway at a speed of about 45 knots (kn) (52 miles per hour / 84 kilometres per hour). The aircraft's undercarriage collapsed when it crossed a drain  from the side of the runway. Accident investigators established "an over-correction of the portward course of the aircraft possibly accompanied by some application of the starboard brake caused the aircraft to swing starboard off the runway and to encounter the French drain with the resulting failure of the undercarriage" as the probable cause. The pilot's over-correction was interpreted as "a grave error of judgement and skill rather than a wrongful act or default", regardless of whether this was accompanied by an application of the aircraft's starboard brake.

 The latter involved a Scottish Aviation Twin Pioneer 3 (registration: G-ANTP) carrying three crew members on a demonstration flight from the Indian Air Force (IAF) base at Jorhat Rowriah Airport, Assam, in northeast India. This resulted in the aircraft striking the ground and bursting into flames on impact, killing all three occupants. Investigators attributed the accident to "an attempt to climb the aircraft on [a] single engine with full flaps and slats during [the] takeoff when its all-up weight was near its maximum limit". This resulted in the aircraft losing its forward speed, stalling and crashing due to an inadequate climb performance in such configuration under the conditions it was operating.

See also
 List of defunct airlines of the United Kingdom

Notes and Citations
Notes

Citations

Sources
 (various backdated issues relating to Scottish Airlines, 1946–1961)
 
  (Aviation News online)
 Pearcy,  Berlin Airlift (Airlife, Shrewsbury* Pearcy, ''Berlin Airlift, 1997)

External links

Scottish Airlines at the Aviation Safety Network Database
Stansted Airport Consultative Committee, Stansted - The Early Years (1942-1966), Flying Troops from across the World
Air-Britain Photographic Images Collection - Consolidated B-24D Liberator III, G-AGZI, Scottish Airlines

 
1946 establishments in Scotland
1961 disestablishments in Scotland
Airlines established in 1946
Airlines disestablished in 1961
Companies based in South Ayrshire
Defunct airlines of Scotland
British companies established in 1946